The 1950 NBA draft was the fourth annual draft of the National Basketball Association (NBA). This is the first draft after the Basketball Association of America (BAA) was renamed the NBA. The draft was held on April 25, 1950, before the 1950–51 season. In this draft, 12 remaining NBA teams took turns selecting amateur U.S. college basketball players. In each round, the teams select in reverse order of their win–loss record in the previous season. The Chicago Stags participated in the draft but folded prior to the start of the season. The draft consisted of 12 rounds comprising 121 players selected.

Draft selections and draftee career notes
Chuck Share from Bowling Green State University was selected first overall by the Boston Celtics. Paul Arizin from Villanova University was selected before the draft as Philadelphia Warriors' territorial pick. The sixth pick, Irwin Dambrot, did not play in the NBA and opted for a career as a dentist. Five players from this draft, Paul Arizin, Bob Cousy, George Yardley, Bill Sharman and Earl Lloyd have been inducted into the Basketball Hall of Fame.

Chuck Cooper, the 12th pick, and Lloyd, the 100th pick, were the first African Americans to be drafted by an NBA team. Lloyd became the first African American to play in the NBA on October 31, 1950, one day before Cooper made his debut.

Key

Draft

Other picks
The following list includes other draft picks who have appeared in at least one NBA game.

Notable undrafted players
These players were not selected in the 1950 draft, but played at least one game in the NBA.

See also
 List of first overall NBA draft picks

References
General

Specific

External links
NBA.com
NBA.com: NBA Draft History

Draft
National Basketball Association draft
NBA draft
NBA draft
1950s in Chicago
Basketball in Chicago
Events in Chicago